= Kristally =

- Directed by: Yakov Kaplunov
- Narrated by: Leonid Khmara
- Cinematography: A. Astafjev
- Music by: V. Oranski
- Production company: Mosnauchfilm
- Release date: December 25, 1948
- Running time: 20 minutes
- Country: Soviet Union
- Language: Russian

Kristally (Russian: Кристаллы) is a 1948 Soviet 3-D film directed by Yakov Kaplunov. It was made by Mosnauchfilm, and is a documentary about how crystals are formed. It was also the first 3-D popular science film with graphic animation.

== Cast ==
- Leonid Khmara as narrator
